Infrapatellar bursitis is inflammation of the superficial or deep infrapatellar bursa. Symptoms may include knee pain, swelling, and redness just below the kneecap. It may be complicated by patellar tendonitis.

Risk factors include kneeling or crawling. It may also be brought on by frequent bending of the knees while standing, squatting, running, or jumping. Diagnosis is generally based on symptom and physical examination. When the deep bursa is involved, bending the knee generally increases the pain. Other conditions that may appear similar include patellar tendonitis and prepatellar bursitis.

Treatment is generally by rest, alternating between ice and heat, and NSAIDs. Infrapatellar bursitis is relatively rare. It has also been called vicar's knee and clergyman's knee.

References

Occupational diseases
Overuse injuries
Soft tissue disorders
Knee injuries and disorders